

Otto Johann Drescher (5 October 1895 – 13 August 1944) was a German general in the Wehrmacht of Nazi Germany during World War II. He was a recipient of the Knight's Cross of the Iron Cross. Drescher died on 13 August 1944 in Memel (Klaipėda).

Awards and decorations

 Knight's Cross of the Iron Cross on 6 April 1944 as generalleutnant and commander of 267th Infantry Division

References

Citations

Bibliography

 

1895 births
1944 deaths
Lieutenant generals of the German Army (Wehrmacht)
Austro-Hungarian military personnel of World War I
Recipients of the clasp to the Iron Cross, 1st class
Recipients of the Gold German Cross
Recipients of the Knight's Cross of the Iron Cross
German Army personnel killed in World War II
People from Svitavy District